In the geological timescale, the Llandovery Epoch (from 443.8 ± 1.5 million years ago to 433.4 ± 0.8 million years ago) occurred at the beginning of the Silurian Period. The Llandoverian Epoch follows the massive Ordovician-Silurian extinction events, which led to a large decrease in biodiversity and an opening up of ecosystems.

Widespread reef building started in this period and continued into the Devonian Period when rising water temperatures are thought to have bleached out the coral by killing their photo symbionts.

The Llandoverian Epoch ended with the Ireviken event which killed off 50% of trilobite species, and 80% of the global conodont species.

Beginning of Silurian

The end of the Ordovician–Silurian extinction event occurred when melting glaciers caused the sea level to rise and eventually stabilize. Biodiversity, with the sustained re-flooding of continental shelves at the onset of the Silurian, rebounded within the surviving orders.

Following the major loss of diversity as the end-Ordovician, Silurian communities were initially less complex and broader niched. Highly endemic faunas, which characterized the Late Ordovician, were replaced by faunas that were amongst the most cosmopolitan in the Phanerozoic, biogeographic patterns that persisted throughout most of the Silurian.

These end Ordovician–Silurian events had nothing like the long-term impact of the Permian–Triassic and Cretaceous-Paleogene extinction events. Nevertheless, a large number of taxa disappeared from the Earth over a short time interval, eliminating and changing diversity.

GSSP 

The epoch was named after Llandovery in Wales. The GSSP for the Silurian is located in a section at Dob's Linn (southern Scotland) in an artificial excavation created just north of the Linn Branch Stream. Two lithological units (formations) occur near the boundary. The lower is the Hartfell Shale ( thick), consisting chiefly of pale gray mudstone with subordinate black shales and several interbedded meta-bentonites.

The base was originally defined as the first appearance of the graptolite Akidograptus ascensus at Dob's Linn, but was later discovered to be imprecise.  It is currently placed between acritarch biozone 5 and last appearance of Pterospathodus amorphognathoides.

It has been recommended to place the GSSP at a slightly higher and correlatable level on the Ireviken datum 2, which coincides approximately with the base of the murchisoni Graptolite Biozone.

Subdivisions
The Llandovery Epoch is subdivided into three stages: Rhuddanian, Aeronian and Telychian.

Regional stages
In North America a different suite of regional stages is sometimes used:
 Ontarian (Early Silurian: late Llandovery)
 Alexandrian (Earliest Silurian: early Llandovery)

In Estonia the following suite of regional stages is used:
 Adavere stage (Early Silurian: late Llandovery)
 Raikküla stage (Early Silurian: middle Llandovery)
 Juuru stage (Earliest Silurian: early Llandovery)

Palaeontology

Plants

Spores and plant microfossils have been found in China and Pennsylvania. There was some movement to the land during the Llandovery but the earliest known vascular plants (Cooksonia) have only been found in rocks of the middle Silurian.

Land animals
Parioscorpio venator was at first described as the earliest fossil land animal in 2020. It was originally described as the oldest known scorpion (437 million years old), but was later re-described as an enigmatic, marine arthropod.

Reef expansion 
Barrier reef systems covered a substantially greater percentage of seafloor than reefs today and they also grew at high latitudes. Possibly the evolution of photo symbionts started in the Llandovery Epoch. Tabulate corals mostly developed as prominent bioherms. Rising water temperatures in the Devonian might have led to bleaching of these corals.

Ireviken event

The Ireviken event was the first of three relatively minor extinction events (the Ireviken, Mulde, and Lau events) during the Silurian Period. The Ireviken overlapped the Llandovery/Wenlock boundary. The event is best recorded at Ireviken, Gotland.

Anatomy of the event
The event lasted around 200,000 years, spanning the base of the Wenlock Epoch.

It comprises eight extinction "datum points"—the first four being regularly spaced, every 31,000 years, and linked to the Milankovic obliquity cycle. The fifth and sixth probably reflect maxima in the precessional cycles, with periods of around 16.5 and 19 ka. The final two data are much further spaced, so harder to link with Milankovic changes.

Casualties
The mechanism responsible for the event originated in the deep oceans, and made its way into the shallower shelf seas. Correspondingly, shallow-water reefs were barely affected, while pelagic and hemipelagic organisms such as the graptolites, conodonts and trilobites were hit hardest. 50% of trilobite species and 80% of the global conodont species become extinct in this interval.

Geochemistry
Subsequent to the first extinctions, excursions in the δ13C and δ18O records are observed; δ13C rises from +1.4‰ to +4.5‰, while δ18O increases from −5.6‰ to −5.0‰.

References

 
01
Geological epochs